Palpifer murinus is a moth of the family Hepialidae. It is found in India. The food plant for this species is Colocasia.

References

Moths described in 1879
Hepialidae